Twanoh State Park is a public recreation area located  southwest of Belfair on the east side of Hood Canal in Mason County, Washington. The park is managed by the Washington State Parks and Recreation Commission.

History
The area was originally the home of the Native American Twana tribes, better known as the Skokomish, from whose name the park's name derives. Evidence of the area's logging history of the 1890s can be seen on the park's woodland hiking trails.

In 1922, the state leased 30 acres to be used as a state park, then after finalizing purchase of the property dedicated the park in 1923. The well-preserved complex of structures created in the 1930s by the Civilian Conservation Corps led to the park's being named to the National Register of Historic Places in 2014.

Activities and amenities
Park activities include camping, hiking, boating, fishing, swimming, waterskiing, crabbing, oyster harvesting, beachcombing, bird watching, wildlife viewing, and horseshoes.

References

External links

Twanoh State Park Washington State Parks and Recreation Commission 
Twanoh State Park Map Washington State Parks and Recreation Commission

Parks in Mason County, Washington
State parks of Washington (state)
National Register of Historic Places in Mason County, Washington
Protected areas established in 1923
Civilian Conservation Corps in Washington (state)
National Park Service rustic in Washington (state)